Mufti Syed Mukhtaruddin Shah is a Pakistani spiritual leader and Islamic scholar. He is currently serving as Sheikh Al Hadith of Jamia Zakariya Darul Aman Karbogha Sharif and Patron of Wifaq ul Madaris Al-Arabia, Pakistan. He is the authorized caliph of Maulana Muhammad Zakaria Kandhalvi. Syed Adnan Kakakhil and Pakistani cricketer Muhammad Rizwan are among his devotees.

Writings
He is the author of many books. Some are:

 ʻAṣr-i ḥāzi̤r men̲ dīnī ik̲h̲tilāfāt aur maslak-i iʻtidāl 
 Musalmānon̲ ke bāhamī ik̲h̲tilāfāt men̲ rāh-i maḥabbat
 Dahrīyat se Islām tak
 Z̲ikr-i Allāh ke faz̤āʼil va masāʼil
 Bilā sūd bainkārī ke k̲h̲ilāf baʻz̤ ʻulamāʼ ke fatvaʹ kī ḥaqīqat is kā pas manẓar va pesh manẓar
 Musalmānon̲ ke bāhamī ik̲h̲tilāfāt men̲ rāh-i muḥabbat

References 

Living people
Jamia Darul Uloom, Karachi alumni
Deobandis
Pakistani Sunni Muslim scholars of Islam
Pakistani Islamic religious leaders
1950 births
Wifaq ul Madaris Al-Arabia people
People from Hangu District, Pakistan